The oddball paradigm is an experimental design used within psychology research.  Presentations of sequences of repetitive stimuli are infrequently interrupted by a deviant stimulus. The reaction of the participant to this "oddball" stimulus is recorded.

Use in ERP research
The oddball method was first used in event-related potential (ERP) research by Nancy Squires, Kenneth Squires and Steven Hillyard at the UC San Diego.

In ERP research it has been found that an event-related potential across the parieto-central area of the skull that usually occurs around 300 ms after stimuli presentation called P300 is larger after the target stimulus. The P300 wave only occurs if the subject is actively engaged in the task of detecting the targets. Its amplitude varies with the improbability of the targets. Its latency varies with the difficulty of discriminating the target stimulus from the standard stimuli.

Detection of these targets reliably evokes transient activity in prefrontal cortical regions. Measuring hemodynamic brain activity in the prefrontal cortex using functional magnetic resonance imaging (fMRI) revealed that the dorsolateral prefrontal cortex is associated with dynamic changes in the mapping of stimuli to responses (e.g. response strategies), independently of any changes in behavior.

Since P300 has been shown to be an attention-dependent cognitive component in wakefulness, one might suppose that it would be absent during sleep; a time in which information processing of external stimuli is commonly thought to be inhibited. Research to date indicates that P300 can be recorded during the transition to sleep and then reappears in REM sleep. Stimuli that are rare and intrusive are more likely to elicit the classic parietal P300 in REM sleep. There is, however, little or no positivity at frontal sites. This is consistent with brain imaging studies that show frontal deactivation is characteristic of REM sleep. These findings indicate that while sleepers may be able to detect stimulus deviance in stage 1 and REM, the frontal contribution to consciousness may be lost.

Studies of cognition often use an oddball paradigm to study effects of stimulus novelty and significance on information processing. However, an oddball tends to be perceptually more novel than the standard, repeated stimulus as well as more relevant to the ongoing task, making it difficult to disentangle effects due to perceptual novelty and stimulus significance. Evaluating different brain ERPs can decipher this effect. A frontro-central N2 component of ERP is primarily affected by perceptual novelty, whereas only the centro-parietal P3 component is modulated by both stimulus significance and novelty.

The classic auditory oddball paradigm can be modified to produce different neural responses and can therefore be used to investigate dysfunctions in sensory and cognitive processing in clinical samples.

A unique application of the oddball paradigm is being used heavily in Schizophrenia research to study the effects in neuronal generator patterns in continuous recognition memory, and the endophenotypes, which provide model on genetic relation of psychiatric diseases that represents phenotypes between manifest clinical syndrome and genetic underpinnings.

Other uses
The oddball paradigm has been extended to use outside of ERP research.

The oddball paradigm has robust effects on pupil dilation that is produced by transient activity of the subcortical Locus Coeruleus. This pupil dilation effect is discussed to indicate a detection of stimulus salience  and is expected to amplify the sensory processing of the salient stimulus by increased neural gain.

The perception of time seems to be modulated by our recent experiences. Humans typically overestimate the perceived duration of the initial event in a stream of identical events. Initial studies suggested that this oddball-induced “subjective time dilation” expanded the perceived duration of oddball stimuli by 30–50% but subsequent research has reported more modest expansion of around 10% or less, and the direction of the effect, whether the viewer perceives an increase or a decrease in duration, also seems to be dependent upon the stimulus used.

References

Psychology experiments
Evoked potentials